Jesse Camacho (born May 29, 1991) is a Canadian film and television actor, best known for his role as Sheldon Blecher in the television series Less Than Kind.

Early life 
The son of actors Mark Camacho and Pauline Little, Camacho was born in Montreal, Quebec. He began acting in childhood, with his early credits including the television series Creepschool and Fries with That? and the films Hatley High and 12 and Holding. He attended Westmount High School in Montreal, Quebec, and briefly attended Dawson College before dropping out to continue his leading role on the HBO Canada series Less Than Kind.

Career 
Camacho's other credits have included roles in the television series Mother Up!, St. Urbain's Horseman and Death Comes to Town, and the films The Trotsky, We're Still Together and Rapture-Palooza. Also, he provides the voice of Binky in Agent Binky: Pets of the Universe (2019-2020, 2022-present). 

In 2019, he was cast as Doug Brazelle in the hit Netflix series Locke & Key and returned in the show's second season. Camacho was a shortlisted nominee for Best Lead Actor in a Comedy Series at the 2nd Canadian Screen Awards.

Personal life 
Since 2013, Camacho has lived in Toronto, Ontario, Canada.

Filmography

Film

Television

References

External links

1991 births
Canadian male television actors
Canadian male film actors
Canadian male voice actors
Canadian male child actors
Male actors from Montreal
Living people
Canadian Comedy Award winners